Sir John de Beauchamp, 1st Baron Beauchamp of Kidderminster (1339–12 May 1388) of Holt Castle in Worcestershire was an administrator and landowner.

Origins
He was the son of Richard de Beauchamp, of Holt (d. 1327), the son of John de Beauchamp, of Holt (d. after 1297), the son of William (III) de Beauchamp (d. 1269), and brother of William de Beauchamp, 9th Earl of Warwick (c.1238-1298).

Career
He served under John of Gaunt in the Spanish campaign of 1372 and in 1373 obtained a grant of a yearly fair at a place called 'le Rode' in the parish of Holt, on the day of St. Mary Magdalene. A favourite of the ailing King Edward III, in the years 1370 to 1375 he received several grants of offices, including the constableship of Bridgnorth Castle. He was elected as a Member of Parliament for Worcestershire to Edward III's last parliament (January 1377) and Richard II's first (October 1377).

Richard II regarded him warmly, and acted as godfather to his son.  Retained in the household, Beauchamp soon received substantial further patronage, and by 1384 he had been made Receiver of the Chamber and Keeper of the King's Jewels. He received the Order of Knighthood on Richard II's entry into Scotland in 1385. That December he was granted for life the office of Justiciar of North Wales, to which was added in August 1386 a charter of liberties within his recently purchased estate at Kidderminster. Even though the Commons demanded in October that a new Steward of the Household be appointed only in parliament, Richard II refused to comply, and in January 1387 he promoted Beauchamp to the stewardship. Even more provocative was Sir John's creation on 10 October following as 'Lord of Beauchamp and Baron of Kidderminster', a new dignity to be maintained from the estates of Deerhurst Priory. This was the first creation of a peerage by letters patent. He was probably the builder of Holt Castle.

Beauchamp's rapid rise from esquire to baron could not be borne by the Lords Appellant, who included his kinsman, Thomas Beauchamp, 12th Earl of Warwick. The latter probably saw the rise of his cousin as a threat to his dominance of the Midlands. Arrested and imprisoned along with three other household knights, Lord Beauchamp was impeached in the Merciless Parliament and condemned by the lords for treason. He was beheaded on Tower Hill on 12 May 1388 and was buried in Worcester Cathedral. Fortunately for his heir, John Beauchamp, 2nd Baron Beauchamp of Kidderminster, then aged eleven, he had entailed certain of his manors, so these were exempt from forfeiture.

Marriage and children
In about 1370 he married Joan FitzWith, daughter and heiress of Robert FitzWith, then a minor in the king's wardship. By Joan he has issue including:  
John Beauchamp, 2nd Baron Beauchamp of Kidderminster (1378–1420) (attainder reversed 1398; forfeit in 1400 by renewal of attainder).

Notes

References

Oxford Dictionary of National Biography

People from Malvern Hills District
1388 deaths
Year of birth unknown
English MPs January 1377
Barons in the Peerage of England
John
Peers created by Richard II
Masters of the Jewel Office
1339 births
English MPs October 1377